Oddballs is an animated adventure-comedy streaming television series created by James Rallison and  Ethan Banville for Netflix. Produced by Netflix Animation and Atomic Cartoons, the series debuted on October 7, 2022. The show features a total of twelve 17–20 minute episodes in its first season. The second season was released on February 24, 2023.

Premise 
Oddballs takes place in the fictional town of Dirt, Arizona. It follows James, a bubble-shaped teen who goes on bizarre adventures with his best friends; a dim-witted crocodile named Max, and, as of the 4th episode, a time-travelling girl named Echo. During each episode, James's rants and questioning of social norms often end up in a disaster.

Cast and characters 
 James Rallison as:
 James, a fictionalized version of Rallison who resembles Rallison's avatar on his YouTube channel. He is a bubble-shaped teen-age boy who enjoys insane misadventures and going on rants, including subjects like toasters, trophies and line-cutting.
 Sagu, a talking cactus that houses James' trailer/treehouse.
 Julian Gant as Max, an anthropomorphic and dim-witted crocodile who is a failed genetic experiment gifted with human intelligence and voice, James's next-door neighbor and best friend. He was previously seen in the music video for Rallison and David Brown's song "Life Is Fun".
 Kimberly Brooks as Echo, a time-travelling teen-age girl who comes from the future and loves eating food, as she comes from a future where processed food went extinct as the result of one of James and Max's actions. Although best friends with James and Max, she sometimes clashes with the former due to his egotism and not believing that she's from the future.
 Carl Faruolo as:
 Greg, Max's father.
 Stuart, a stereotypical bully slime who is capable of possessing people and a proficient chess player.
 Erika Ishii as:
 Jenna, Max's sister who works at the "You Break, I Don't Judge" electronics repair shop.
 Liv, Max's mother who shows a cold and calculating demeanor towards him.
 Scott Menville as Toasty / Declan, an artificially intelligent toaster created by James and Max who becomes evil.
 Kari Wahlgren as young Toasty
 Harland Williams as Patrick, James' father who is usually mild-mannered and submissive.
 Debra Wilson as Louise, James' mother who is an astro-physicist that shows a stricter attitude towards her son.
 Gary Anthony Williams as Mr. McFly, an anthropomorphic fly who is a teacher at the Dirt school.
 Nicolas Cantu as:
 Smooth Jason.
 Wrinkly Jason.
 Emily Eiden as Maz Scare-Ah, a goth unicorn.
 Fred Stoller as Food-Ball Joe.
 Parvesh Cheena as Principal Loudspeaker.
 Stephen Stanton as Chef Throgbort.
 Misty Lee as Roxanne.
 Paul Rugg as:
 Doctor Bolster.
 Clerk.
 Bob Bergen as Geefus.
 Jane Lynch as Grand-Ma.
 Ethan Banville as Bob Aw-Man.
 Courtenay Taylor as Doctor Squats.
 Ryan George as Byron Sellers.

Production 

Series creators James Rallison and Ethan Banville pitched the series to Netflix in early 2020, with the service picking up the series in August of that year. According to Rallison, the entire production of the series occurred remotely, amid studios locking down during the COVID-19 pandemic. He also said in the video that the show would premiere later in the year. On September 16, 2022, an official trailer for its first season was released on Rallison, Banville and Netflix's YouTube channels, with an official release date of October 7 announced. Later the same month, Rallison uploaded a YouTube video titled "Pitching a Show", which goes over his process pitching the show and the show's screenwriting bible. On January 25, 2023, an official trailer for its second season was released on Banville and Netflix's YouTube channels, and it was released shortly after on Friday the 24th of February in the same year.  This show was also animated in Toon Boom as rigs and looked over by Hallis Blaney.

Episodes

Season 1 (2022) 
Season 1 premiered on Friday 7 October, 2022, it has 12 episodes, the first of which being Raising Toasty & the last being Nugget Nonsense.

Season 2 (2023) 
Season 2 premiered on Friday 24 February, 2023. It has 8 episodes, four less than the previous; the first episode being The Show Mustn’t Go On & the last being Toasty’s Goodbye.

References

External links

 
 

2020s American animated television series
2020s American children's comedy television series
2020s Canadian animated television series
2020s Canadian children's television series
2020s Canadian comedy television series
American children's animated comedy television series
Canadian children's animated comedy television series
English-language Netflix original programming
Netflix children's programming
Television series based on Internet-based works
Television series by Netflix Animation
Television series impacted by the COVID-19 pandemic
2022 American television series debuts
2022 Canadian television series debuts